Really Simple Discovery (RSD) is an XML format and a publishing convention for making services exposed by a blog, or other web software, discoverable by client software.

It is a way to reduce the information required to set up editing/blogging software to three well known elements: username, password, and homepage URL. Any other critical settings should either be defined in the RSD file related to the website, or discoverable using the information provided.

History
RSD was authored by Daniel Berlinger in the Really Simple Discoverability 1.0 specification.

Format
To make use of RSD, the owner of a site places a link tag in the head section of the homepage which indicates the location of the RSD file.  An example of what MediaWiki uses is:

<link rel="EditURI" type="application/rsd+xml" href="https://en.wikipedia.org/w/api.php?action=rsd" />

If this tag is missing or the file is not found, clients should look in the default location which is a file named rsd.xml in the webroot. For example, at https://example.net/rsd.xml.

Contents

Here is a sample RSD file, from "Really Simple Discoverability 1.0":

<?xml version="1.0" ?> 
<rsd version="1.0" xmlns="http://archipelago.phrasewise.com/rsd" >
    <service>
        <engineName>Blog Munging CMS</engineName> 
        <engineLink>http://www.blogmunging.com/</engineLink>
        <homePageLink>http://www.userdomain.com/</homePageLink>
        <apis>
            <api name="MetaWeblog" preferred="true" apiLink="http://example.com/xml/rpc/url" blogID="123abc" />
            <api name="Blogger" preferred="false" apiLink="http://example.com/xml/rpc/url" blogID="123abc" />
            <api name="MetaWiki" preferred="false" apiLink="http://example.com/some/other/url" blogID="123abc" />
            <api name="Antville" preferred="false" apiLink="http://example.com/yet/another/url" blogID="123abc" />
            <api name="Conversant" preferred="false" apiLink="http://example.com/xml/rpc/url" blogID="">
                <settings>
                    <docs>http://www.conversant.com/docs/api/ </docs> 
                    <notes>Additional explanation here.</notes>
                    <setting name="service-specific-setting">a value</setting> 
                    <setting name="another-setting">another value</setting> 
                    ... 
                </settings>
            </api>
        </apis>
    </service>
</rsd>

MediaWiki example:
<?xml version="1.0"?>
<rsd version="1.0" xmlns="http://archipelago.phrasewise.com/rsd">
    <service>
        <apis>
            <api name="MediaWiki" preferred="true" apiLink="http://en.wikipedia.org/w/api.php" blogID="">
                <settings>
                    <docs xml:space="preserve">http://mediawiki.org/wiki/API</docs>
                    <setting name="OAuth" xml:space="preserve">false</setting>
                </settings>
            </api>
        </apis>
        <engineName xml:space="preserve">MediaWiki</engineName>
        <engineLink xml:space="preserve">http://www.mediawiki.org/</engineLink>
    </service>
</rsd>

Usage of RSD
 StatusNet.
 MediaWiki.
 WordPress.

See also
 Blog
 CMS
 WS-Discovery
 UDDI
 ebXML
 WSDL

References

External links
 Really Simple Discoverability 1.0 by Daniel Berlinger
  Forum thread with participation by Berlinger, contains common language explanations

Network protocols
Web services
Web service specifications
XML-based standards